Romain Basque (born 30 June 1995) is a French professional footballer who plays as a midfielder for Championnat National club Châteauroux.

Career
Basque made his professional debut for Quevilly-Rouen in a Ligue 2 1–1 tie with Lorient on 29 July 2017.

On 15 July 2021, Basque signed for Azerbaijan Premier League club Neftçi. He left the club by mutual consent on 29 December 2021.

On 1 January 2022, Basque returned to France, signing for Championnat National side Châteauroux.

Career statistics

References

External links
 QRM Profile
 Foot-National Profile
 
 
 

Living people
1995 births
Sportspeople from Dieppe, Seine-Maritime
Association football midfielders
French footballers
US Quevilly-Rouen Métropole players
Le Havre AC players
Neftçi PFK players
LB Châteauroux players
Ligue 2 players
Championnat National players
Championnat National 2 players
Championnat National 3 players
Azerbaijan Premier League players
French expatriate footballers
Expatriate footballers in Azerbaijan
French expatriate sportspeople in Azerbaijan
Footballers from Normandy